Miriam Webster is an Australian Pentecostal worship leader and contemporary singer/songwriter.
She is most well known for her classical worship songs with Hillsong Music Australia. Miriam won A.C.E State Student music award as a teenager for singing at the convention in Queensland, Australia. While staying in Sydney in 1996 she joined her friend who attended Hills Christian Life Centre which is known today as Hillsong Church to go to a Friday night youth service. Miriam was asked to sing this night as they were looking for an item so she sang a song she had penned years before called 'Fall upon your knees'. She joined the worship team months later and from there she has led worship in services, rallies, connect groups and conferences.
She has toured Australia, New Zealand, Asia and the United States, and recently released her solo album Made Me Glad.

She served with the Hillsong Church in Sydney from 1996 to 2007 and was featured on numerous Hillsong Music praise-and-worship albums since 1997. Among her notable congregational songs are "Dwelling Places", "Made Me Glad", "Welcome In This Place" and "You Are Faithful". Webster also led worship with Steve Mcpherson and Darlene Zschech at the 25th Hillsong Conference Classic Medlies.

List of songs by Webster
 It is He
 Most Holy
 Do what you say
 Til I see your face
 Fall upon your knees
 Angel of the Lord
 Dwelling Places
 You are faithful
 Made me glad
 Exceeding Joy
 What the Lord has done in me
 I will love
 The only name (co-write with Darlene Zschech)
 All you are (co-write with Jonas Myrin)
 Dedication
 Jesus won it all
 Welcome in this place
 Mercies
 Loving Kindness
 Praise Him
 Draw Near
 Marvelous
 Greater
 Never Alone
 Who will stand
 Glory to Jesus
 Loving Kindness
 Draw Near
 Love overflows
 Rescued me

References

Year of birth missing (living people)
Living people
Australian women singers
Australian gospel singers
Australian Pentecostals
Hillsong musicians